The term DSSA can stand for a number of things, including:
 Dental Students' Scientific Association of Egypt
 The U.S. Defense Security Service Academy
 domain-specific software architecture
 Department of Anti-terrorism Strategic Studies, an Italian organization under investigation by the Italian police
 Denver Society of Security Analysts
 The Distributed System Security Architecture, a computer security architecture
 The Duluth, South Shore and Atlantic Railroad
 Dynamic Security Surveillance Agent, a software application written in Java language
 The Duluth Superior Sailing Association, offering the joy of sailing to the entire Duluth-Superior community.
 Data Storage System for ACSF, a system to record information about the driving with an automatically commanded steering function.